Sessiluncus is a genus of mites in the family Ologamasidae. There are about 14 described species in Sessiluncus.

Species
These 14 species belong to the genus Sessiluncus:

 Sessiluncus abalaae Datta & Bhattacharjee, 1991
 Sessiluncus aegypticus Nasr & Afifi, 1984
 Sessiluncus bengalensis Bhattacharyya, 1977
 Sessiluncus calcuttaensis Bhattacharyya, 1977
 Sessiluncus cavensis Willmann, 1940
 Sessiluncus colchicus Bregetova, 1977
 Sessiluncus femoralis Bhattacharyya, 1977
 Sessiluncus heterotarsus (Canestrini, 1897)
 Sessiluncus holostaspoides Canestrini, 1884
 Sessiluncus hungaricus Karg, 1964
 Sessiluncus indicus Bhattacharyya, 1977
 Sessiluncus leei Datta & Bhattacharjee, 1991
 Sessiluncus oculatus Vitzthum, 1935
 Sessiluncus reticulatus Loots, 1980

References

Ologamasidae